Janeah Stewart (born July 21, 1996) is a student-athlete on the University of Mississippi women's track and field team. The four event thrower from Illinois, was awarded All-American status her first three years of college. Janeah Stewart's winning weight throw of 23.18m/76-0.75 broke the SEC meet record that had stood since 2004 and moved her up to No. 1 in the nation this year and No. 6 in NCAA history.

Professional
2017 World Rankings
Women's Shot Put	41
Women's Discus Throw	77
Women's Hammer Throw	99
 

2018 World Rankings
Women's Shot Put	36
Women's Discus Throw	109
Women's Hammer Throw	13

Stewart placed 13th by throwing the Hammer  and fouled in the shot put at 2017 USA Outdoor Track and Field Championships.
Stewart placed 4th by throwing the Hammer  and placed 5th by throwing  in the shot put at 2018 USA Outdoor Track and Field Championships.

College
Stewart earned two NCAA Division I All-America honors after her 2018 NCAA Division I Outdoor Track and Field Championships where she threw Shot put  to place fifth, and Hammer throw  to place first. Her hammer performance is a top 10 college throw all time.

Stewart earned two NCAA Division I All-America honors after her 2018 NCAA Division I Indoor Track and Field Championships where she threw Shot put  to place fifteenth, and Weight throw  to place third.

Stewart earned two All-America honors after her 2016 National Junior College Athletic Association indoor championship where she threw Shot put  to place second, and Weight throw  to place second. Stewart is a 2016 Kansas Relays champion in the hammer after throwing . Stewart is a 2016 Drake Relays champion in the shot put after throwing . Stewart earned to All-America honors after her 2016 National Junior College Athletic Association outdoor championship where she threw shot put  to place second, discus  to place first, and hammer  to place first. 

Stewart is 2016 NJCAA National Women’s Outdoor Field Athlete of the Year, a four-time NJCAA national champion (2015 indoor shot put, 2015 outdoor shot put, 2016 outdoor discus, 2016 outdoor hammer) and 2016 runner-up in the outdoor shot put, nine-time NJCAA All-American, earning honors in the indoor and outdoor shot put, indoor weight throw, outdoor hammer throw and discus, and 2016 USTFCCCA Women’s Midwest Indoor Field Athlete of the Year.

Stewart set Iowa Central Community College school record holder in the shot put , discus , hammer throw  and weight throw .

Prep
Stewart is a 2014 graduate of South Holland's Thornwood High School.

References

External links
 Ole Miss and South Holland's Thornwood HS 2014 profile for Janeah Stewart
 
 
 South Holland's Thornwood HS 2014 results for Janeah Stewart
 

1996 births
Living people
American female shot putters
American female discus throwers
American female hammer throwers
Female weight throwers
Track and field athletes from Illinois
Ole Miss Rebels women's track and field athletes
People from Calumet City, Illinois
USA Indoor Track and Field Championships winners